Xinjian Subdistrict is a subdistrict in Yuci District, Jinzhong, Shanxi province, China. , it has 9 residential communities under its administration.

See also 
 List of township-level divisions of Shanxi

References 

Township-level divisions of Shanxi
Jinzhong